Missoula National Forest was established as the Missoula Forest Reserve by the U.S. Forest Service in Montana on November 6, 1906, with a total area of . It became a National Forest on March 4, 1907. On July 1, 1908, Missoula received a portion of Hell Gate National Forest. On December 16, 1931, the entire forest was divided between Lolo National Forest and Deerlodge National Forest and the name was discontinued.

See also
 List of forests in Montana

References

External links
Forest History Society
Listing of the National Forests of the United States and Their Dates (from the Forest History Society website) Text from Davis, Richard C., ed. Encyclopedia of American Forest and Conservation History. New York: Macmillan Publishing Company for the Forest History Society, 1983. Vol. II, pp. 743-788.

Former National Forests of Montana
1906 establishments in Montana
Missoula, Montana